The Hundred of Whyte is a cadastral unit of hundred located in the Mid North of South Australia in the approach to the lower Flinders Ranges. It is one of the  hundreds of the County of Victoria.

It is named for John Whyte (pastoralist).

See also
Whyte Yarcowie, South Australia

References

Whyte
1869 establishments in Australia